"Throwing Stones" is a song by the Grateful Dead.  It appears on their 1987 album In the Dark.  It was also released as a single, with a B-side of "When Push Comes to Shove".

The song is based loosely on the nursery rhyme Ring Around the Rosie.  The song repeatedly mentions the line Ashes! Ashes! We all fall down!.

The first live performance of "Throwing Stones" was on September 17, 1982, at the Cumberland County Civic Center in Portland, Maine.

References

Grateful Dead songs
Songs written by Bob Weir
1987 songs